The Chamberlain–Ferris Act (39 Stat. 218) of June 9, 1916 was an Act of the United States Congress that ruled that  of the original  granted to the Southern Pacific Company (successor to the Oregon and California Railroad) in California and Oregon were revested to the United States, and put under the control of the General Land Office, which was to dispose of the lands and timber through auction sales. The lands were named the Oregon and California Railroad Revested Lands (better known as the O&C Lands).

The bill was sponsored by Senator George E. Chamberlain of Oregon and Representative Scott Ferris of Oklahoma, both Democrats.

The results proved disappointing, and the act was repealed by the subsequent Oregon and California Revested Lands Sustained Yield Management Act of 1937 of August 28, 1937, which authorized the Secretary of the Interior to establish sustained yield units on the land,  of which was still unsold.  This act established the O&C administration to manage the lands.

See also 
 Oregon land fraud scandal
 64th United States Congress (1915–17)
 74th United States Congress (1935–37)

References

External links 
 Legislative history of O&C lands
 
 Text of the statute

1916 in American law
United States federal public land legislation
Land use in Oregon
History of California